Bandar Charak (also Romanized as Bandar-e Chārak and Band-e Chārak; also known simply as Chārak) is a coastal city and capital of Shibkaveh District, in Bandar Lengeh County, Hormozgan Province, Iran. At the 2006 census, its population was 2,958, in 609 families.

References 

Populated places in Bandar Lengeh County
Cities in Hormozgan Province
Populated coastal places in Iran
Port cities and towns of the Persian Gulf
Port cities and towns in Iran